Ken Mann (born 31 March 1941) is a former  Australian rules footballer who played with St Kilda in the Victorian Football League (VFL).

Notes

External links 

Living people
1941 births
Australian rules footballers from Western Australia
St Kilda Football Club players
Claremont Football Club players